Paneion may refer to:
 temple of Pan (god)
 Banias, a location in the Golan Heights
 Paneion, a synonym of Poa, a genus of grass
 Serapeum, an ancient temple
 , a hill range in Attica, Greece